Wasim Ali (born 7 December 1998) is a cricketer who plays for the Oman national cricket team. In February 2019, he was named in Oman's Twenty20 International (T20I) squad for the 2018–19 Oman Quadrangular Series in Oman. He made his T20I debut for Oman against Scotland on 17 February 2019. He made his One Day International (ODI) debut on 14 March 2022, for Oman against Namibia.

References

External links
 

1998 births
Living people
Omani cricketers
Oman One Day International cricketers
Oman Twenty20 International cricketers
Pakistani expatriates in Oman
Place of birth missing (living people)